Franciszek Sewerin Wład (17 October 1888 in Ottynia – 18 September 1939 at Januszew lodge near Wyszogród) was a Polish brigadier general. As of October 28, 1930 and until the German invasion of Poland, he commanded the 14th Infantry Division and was mortally wounded in the battle of Bzura. He subsequently died on 18 September 1939.

Awards and decorations

War Order of Virtuti Militari - Silver Cross
Krzyż Walecznych two times<
Officer's Cross to the Order of Polonia Restituta
Royal Order of the Sword - Commander
Commander's Cross to the Order of Polonia Restituta
Gold Cross of Merit
Knight to the Legion of Honour
Commander to the Order of the Crown of Romania
Medal 10-lecia Odzyskania Niepodleglosci
Medal Pamiatkowy za Wojne 1918-1921
Znak 1 pspodh.

References

External links
Generals.dk

1888 births
1939 deaths
Polish generals
Polish military personnel killed in World War II
Polish people of German descent